Carl Happel (1819-1914) was a German painter.

References

1819 births
1914 deaths
German male painters
19th-century German painters
19th-century German male artists
20th-century German painters
20th-century German male artists